Clontytallon is a rural townland in County Westmeath, Ireland. The townland is located in the civil parish of Castlelost. The townland is bordered by the townlands of Fearmore, Whitewell, Castlelost and Derry to the east, Castlelost West to the west and Kilbride to the north. The town of Rochfortbridge is to the south, with Tyrrellspass to the south-west.

The townland is accessed by roads connecting from the R440 and R446 regional roads.

History 
The townland is recorded on the Griffith Valuation in 1868, showing 3 tenants living in the area at that time.

References 

Townlands of County Westmeath